This is a list of members of the Northern Territory Legislative Assembly from 2016 to 2020, as elected at the 2016 election.

 Three MPs—Jeff Collins (Fong Lim), Scott McConnell (Stuart) and Ken Vowles (Johnston)—were excluded from the Labor caucus for the remainder of the current term on 21 December 2018. Collins resigned from the Labor Party to sit as an independent on 8 February 2019, while McConnell followed in resigning from the parliamentary party on 19 February 2019. Vowles remained a member of the Labor Party outside caucus, until his resignation from the assembly on 31 January 2020. Joel Bowden was elected to replace him at a by-election on 29 February 2020.
 Former chief minister and CLP leader Terry Mills founded the Territory Alliance party in late 2019. Former Labor MLA Jeff Collins and former CLP MLA Robyn Lambley joined the party in March 2020.

See also
 Click here to read a list of members party affiliations as of 20 February 2019
2016 Northern Territory general election

References

Members of Northern Territory parliaments by term
21st-century Australian politicians